Aeroport or Aéroport may refer to:

Aéroport, a quartier in Saint Barthélemy, France
Aeroport (Kyiv Metro), a station on the Podilsko-Vyhurivska Line of the Kyiv Metro, Kyiv, Ukraine
Aeroport (Metrovalencia), a station of the Metrovalencia, Valencia, Spain
Aeroport (Moscow Metro), a station of the Moscow Metro, Moscow, Russia
Aeroport, Oymyakonsky District, Sakha Republic, a village in Oymyakonsky District, Sakha Republic
Aeroport, Tomponsky District, Sakha Republic, a village in Tomponsky District, Sakha Republic
Aeroport District, a district of Northern Administrative Okrug of Moscow, Russia
Airport T2 station, a Rodalies de Catalunya station serving Barcelona–El Prat Airport, in El Prat de Llobregat, Catalonia, Spain

See also
Aeroporto (disambiguation)
Airport (disambiguation)
Aviaport, the name of several villages in the Sakha Republic